Donovan King is a professional actor, teacher, historian, and tour guide from Montreal, Quebec. As the founder of Haunted Montreal, a company that researches ghost stories and offers haunted tours, King hires professional actors to lead the tours and publishes a new ghost story every month on the Haunted Montreal Blog. King is also a performance activist and experimental theatre artist who juggles acting, teaching, directing, dramaturgy, and theory to create dramatic projects that challenge systemic oppression. Known for his commitment to education and community, King assisted with the establishment of the Montreal Fringe Festival in 1991, is the author of Doing Theatre in Montreal and he set up the Montreal Infringement Festival in 2004.

Background

King holds a Masters of Fine Arts degree in Theatre Studies from the University of Calgary, a Bachelor of Fine Arts in Drama in Education from Concordia University, a Bachelor of Education from McGill University and a Diplome d’Études Collegiales in Acting from John Abbott College.  He is the author of Optative Theatre: A Critical Theory, and he facilitates various activist campaigns and drama classes in Montreal.  He has been known to collaborate with other theatre activists internationally such as Augusto Boal, Andrew Boyd of the Billionaires for Bush, Reverend Billy, Stephen Duncombe, Larry Bogad, Kathryn Blume, Kurt Schneiderman, Jason C. McLean, Gary St. Laurent, and many others.

As the co-founder of the Optative Theatrical Laboratories (OTL) King strives to revitalise theatre as an agent for social change through experimental practice, critical theory, and sustained performance.  The OTL designs interconnected theatrical campaigns such as Car Stories, that target instances of oppression, and employs a diversity of cutting-edge activist performance techniques: culture-jamming, Viral Theatre, Sousveillance Theatre, meme-warfare, Electronic Disturbance Theater, and Global Invisible Theatre, to name a few.

In 2006, King took issue with racism inherent in what has been called "Canada’s First Play" – the 1606 The Theatre of Neptune (Le Théâtre de Neptune) by Marc Lescarbot. OTL staged a counter-performance called "Sinking Neptune" in Annapolis Royal on the day of the "400th Theatre Anniversary" (November 14, 2006), in order to protest the original.

In 2012, Donovan King was invited to the first World Fringe Congress in Edinburgh, Scotland, a gathering of Fringe administrators from round the world. Participating with a critical eye to corporate manipulation at Fringe Festivals, King published an article following the Congress called " World Fringe Congress to welcome infringement festival" that examines some of the more contentious issues, such unethical corporate sponsorship, pay-to-play fees and the trademarking of the word "Fringe" in Canada.

King was invited back to the 2nd World Fringe Congress in 2014, again in Edinburgh, to deliver a workshop called "A World Fringe Philosophy" where he called on stakeholders to create policies at Fringe festivals to protect artists, spectators and communities from excessive corporate manipulation.

The 3rd World Fringe Congress in 2016 was moved to Montreal and hosted by the Canadian Association of Fringe Festivals (CAFF), an organization that trademarked the word "Fringe" in Canada. King responded by moving the Montreal Infringement Festival from June to November, to coincide with the World Fringe Congress and also created the World Infringement Congress, held immediately after the original event, to examine issues being ignored, such as the "Fringe" trademark.

This time, all potential World Fringe Congress delegates had to apply to participate. The applications of King along with other organizers at the Montreal and Buffalo Infringement Festivals were rejected without explanation, raising questions about exclusion and censorship at Canadian Fringe Festivals. Buffalo burlesque artist Cat McCarthy wrote an article in Buffalo's The Daily Public denouncing the decision and calling for a resolution to the conflict. King responded by inviting CAFF representatives to a Canadian Parliamentary-style debate at the World Infringement Congress regarding their trademark on the word "Fringe".

More recently, King has been challenging systemic racism and discrimination in Montreal's tourism industry, specifically at Tourisme Montréal, the Institut de tourisme et d'hôtellerie du Québec, the A.P.G.T. (Association professionnelle des guides touristiques) and the City of Montreal, which has by-Law G-2 that prohibits tour guides outside a cartel of mostly white guides.

King has also been busy as a Director of the Montreal Irish Monument Park Foundation trying to preserve local Irish-Montreal heritage from erasure and desecration.

Career

Partial directing 

Grease''', JPPS, Montreal, 2006The Lysistrata Project, OTL, Montreal, 2003Miss Julie: a theatrical experiment into the psychosis of a. strindberg, University of Calgary, 2000Waiting For God, Nickel & Dime Productions, Calgary, 1999Call Me, Infinitheatre, Montréal, 1999
 MECCA Award – Best Production (semi-professional)Godspell, Lewisham Operatic Society, London, England, 1996Mrs. Fieldstone’s Water Retention Problem, Greene Pressure Theatre, Montréal, 1995The Tinker’s Wedding, Wahoo Family Theatre, 1994The Misanthrope, Wahoo Family Theatre, 1993Tiger Mouth, Kindergarten Players, Montréal, 1993

 Filmography My Grad Date (2004)Death by Latté (2004)The Legend of Jackie Robinson (2003)

 Partial performance theater La Grande Masquerade, Groupe-Conseil L’Entracte, 2007–presentLes Fantômes du Vieux-Montréal, GuidaTour, 2006–presentSinking Neptune, OTL, Montreal, 2005–2006Car Stories, OTL, Montreal, 2001–presentWal*Jam, OTL, Montreal, 2003Quartier des contre-Spectacles, OTL/Place des Arts, Montreal, 2003Stones Scandal, Galway Arts Festival, Ireland, 2001FJOLZ!, Elvagel Performance Festival, Elsinore, Denmark, 2001CorporACT, Auckland, New Zealand, 1997–1998Monsterworld Inc., Chateau Greystoke, Montréal, 1994

 Partial traditional theater The Captives, Knebworth House, EnglandEver After, Out Of Our Heads & One Yellow Rabbit, CalgaryThe Tempest, Stage 2 Productions, Auckland, New ZealandAnne of Green Gables, Montreal Concordia Players & ACT, Hong KongManhattan, Je Vous Dis, Theatre 21st Century, MontréalWho Ran Off With Dr. Seuss?, Wahoo Family Theatre Co., Montréal Fringe Fest.The Misadventures…., Concordia University Theatre DepartmentRising of the Moon, Wahoo Family Theatre Co., MontréalSt. George & the Dragon, Christmas Mummering Company, MontréalL’Avare (The Miser)', Cleante Thé à l’âtre, Montréal Fringe Festival

 Bibliography A Dramaturgical Toolbox for Sinking Neptune, Optative Free Press, 2005Optative Theatre: a critical theory for challenging Oppression and Spectacle, University of Calgary, 2004The Warders Bible, Vardon PLC, London, 1997Strategies to enhance live entertainments at London and York Dungeons, Vardon PLC, London, 1996Doing Theatre in Montreal'', Quebec Drama Federation, 1995

References

External links
 Donovan King at the Canadian Theatre Encyclopedia]
 Optative Theatrical Laboratories official website
 Infringement Festival official website
 Optative Theatrical Laboratories press links
 Optative Theatre: A Critical Theory for challenging Spectacle and Oppression
 Sinking Neptune

Canadian male stage actors
Anglophone Quebec people
Quebec people of Irish descent
Fringe theatre
Living people
1972 births
University of Calgary alumni
Concordia University alumni
McGill University Faculty of Education alumni
Male actors from Montreal